Frank Bryant may refer to:
 Frank Bryant (cricketer) (1909–1984), Australian cricketer
 Frank Bryant (politician) (1864–1946), Australian politician
 Frank Bryant, of the  American musical duo Just Brothers

See also
 Francis Bryant (born 1982), known as Frankie, New Zealand rugby union player
 Frank Briant (1865–1934), radical British Liberal Party politician
 Frank Briante (1905–1996), American football player